Salt was a Swedish grunge alternative rock band, who had one hit single from the album Auscultate, "Bluster", in the United States in 1996.  "So" was released as a second single from Auscultate but did not achieve the same level of success.

Salt formed in 1992 after its members had played together informally, with others, at an art school. The group signed with Island Records in 1995, releasing the album Auscultate the following year; this album reached No. 33 on the U.S. Billboard Heatseekers chart. The album's lead single, "Bluster", was a rock radio hit in America, reaching No. 21 on the Modern Rock Tracks chart. The group released a collection of b-sides and unreleased material in 1997.

Members
Nino Ramsby - guitar, vocals
Daniel Ewerman - bass
Jim Tegman - drums

Discography
Bluster (EP) (Island Independent, 1995)
Auscultate (Island Records, 1996)
Delay Me Down and Make Me Wah Wah!! (Meltdown Records, 1997)

References

Swedish alternative rock groups
Musical groups established in 1992
Island Records artists
1992 establishments in Sweden